Artemis 3 (officially Artemis III) is planned as the first crewed Moon landing mission of the Artemis program and the first crewed flight of the Starship HLS lander. Scheduled for launch in December 2025, Artemis 3 is planned to be the second crewed Artemis mission and the first crewed lunar landing since Apollo 17 in December 1972. Artemis 3 is expected to land the first woman and first person of color on the Moon.

Overview 
The Artemis III plan is to land a crew at the Moon's south polar region. It is planned to have two astronauts on the surface of the Moon for about one week. The mission is intended to be the first to place a woman and a non-white person on the Moon. While up to four astronauts would leave Earth on board Orion MPCV, the surface mission with the Human Landing System (HLS) will consist of two crew members, who will remain on the surface for 6.5 days. The remaining astronauts will stay on board Orion. The two astronauts will conduct up to four spacewalks on the Moon's surface, performing a variety of scientific observations, including sampling water ice. Before the Artemis III landing, some additional equipment will be pre-positioned on the surface, including an unpressurized rover for astronauts to use during their lunar excursions. This rover will have the capability to be controlled remotely.

Spacecraft

Space Launch System 

The Space Launch System is a super-heavy-lift launcher used to launch the Orion spacecraft from Earth to a trans-lunar orbit. This will be the final mission using SLS Block 1, the design used for the first three missions. Afterward, from Artemis 4, until the proposed Artemis 9, all Space Launch System and Artemis missions will use SLS Block 1B, with an expanded Exploration Upper Stage, and a cargo hold to transport other payloads.

Orion 

Orion is the crew transport vehicle used by all Artemis crewed missions. It will transport the crew from Earth to the Gateway orbit, and return them back to Earth. It has a crew capacity of 4, and may also be utilized to carry crew and cargo in deep space exploration.

Gateway 

Gateway is a small modular space station to be established in near-rectilinear halo orbit (NRHO) prior to the Artemis 3 mission. HLS and Orion will both dock to Gateway for crew transfer. To mitigate the effects of a possible schedule slip, the Artemis 3 mission does not depend on Gateway. If Gateway is unavailable, astronauts will transfer directly from Orion to HLS.

Starship HLS 

After a multi-phase design effort, on 16 April 2021, NASA selected SpaceX to develop Starship HLS and deliver it to the Gateway orbit prior to arrival of the crew for use on the Artemis 3 mission. The delivery requires that Starship HLS be refueled in low Earth orbit (LEO) before boosting to the NRHO, and this refueling requires a pre-positioned propellant depot in LEO that is filled by multiple tanker flights. Two astronauts will transfer from Orion to Starship HLS, which will descend to the lunar surface and sustain them for several days before returning them to Orion. Following the return of the astronauts, Starship HLS will be disposed of by sending it into heliocentric orbit.

Development 

Upon the December 2017 ratification of the Trump administration's Space Policy Directive 1, a crewed lunar campaign – later known as the Artemis program – utilising the Orion Multi-Purpose Crew Vehicle (MPCV) and a space station in lunar orbit was established. Originally billed as Exploration Mission-3 (EM-3), the goal of the mission was to send four astronauts into a near-rectilinear halo orbit around the Moon and deliver the ESPRIT and U.S. Utilization Module to the lunar space station, known as the Gateway. By May 2019 however, ESPRIT and the U.S. Utilization Module – now called HALO – were re-manifested to fly separately on a commercial launch vehicle instead. Artemis 3, as it was now billed, was repurposed to accelerate the first crewed lunar landing of the Artemis program by the end of 2024, with a profile that would've seen the Orion MPCV rendezvous with a minimal Gateway made up of only the Power and Propulsion Element and a small habitat/docking node with an attached commercially-procured lunar lander known as the Human Landing System (HLS).

By early 2020, plans for Orion and the HLS to rendezvous with the Gateway were abandoned in favour of a solo demonstration of Orion and HLS, and development of the Gateway independent of the Artemis program.

On 10 August 2021, an Office of Inspector General audit reported a conclusion that the spacesuits would not be ready until April 2025 at the earliest, likely delaying the mission from the planned late 2024 launch date.

On 9 November 2021, the Administrator of NASA Bill Nelson confirmed that Artemis 3 will take place no earlier than 2025.

, Artemis 3 is scheduled to launch no earlier than December 2025.

References

External links 

 Orion website at nasa.gov
 Space Launch System website at nasa.gov

2025 in spaceflight
Artemis program
Crewed missions to the Moon
Orion (spacecraft)
Space Launch System
2025 in the United States
Missions to the Moon
Crewed spacecraft
Future human spaceflights
Lunar Gateway